

Current

 AC Hotel Portland Downtown
 Benson Hotel
 The Bidwell Marriott Portland
 Canopy by Hilton Portland Pearl District
 Crystal Hotel
 DoubleTree by Hilton Hotel Portland
 Heathman Hotel
 Hilton Portland Hotel
 Holiday Inn Portland-Columbia Riverfront
 Hotel deLuxe
 Hotel Eastlund
 Hotel Grand Stark
 Hotel Rose
 Hotel Vance, Portland, a Tribute Portfolio Hotel
 The Hoxton, Portland
 Hyatt Centric Downtown Portland
 Hyatt Regency Portland
 Imperial Hotel
 Jupiter Hotel
 Kennedy School
 Kenton Hotel
 KEX Hotel
 Hotel Lucia
 Mark Spencer Hotel
 Moxy
 Multnomah Hotel
 The Nines
 Paramount Hotel
 Porter Portland
 Portland Marriott Downtown Waterfront
 Sentinel Hotel
 Seward Hotel

Former

 Arminius Hotel
 Broadway Hotel
 Calumet Hotel
 Campbell Court Hotel
 Campbell Hotel
 Clyde Hotel
 Commodore Hotel
 Congress Hotel
 Cornelius Hotel
 Elks Temple
 Fairmount Hotel
 Hamilton Hotel
 Hill Hotel
 Hotel Albion
 Hotel Alder
 Hotel Ramapo
 Hoyt Hotel
 Merchant Hotel
 Osborn Hotel
 Park Heathman Hotel
 Portland Hotel
 Roosevelt Hotel
 Sovereign Hotel
 Trinity Place Apartments

Proposed
 Ritz-Carlton, Portland

Hotels in Portland, Oregon
Hotels